Albert William Robinson (17 June 1878 – 21 March 1901) was an Australian rules footballer who played for the Melbourne Football Club in the Victorian Football League (VFL).
He died after struggling with tuberculosis for several years.

Notes

External links 

1878 births
1901 deaths
Australian rules footballers from Victoria (Australia)
Melbourne Football Club players
20th-century deaths from tuberculosis
Tuberculosis deaths in Australia
Infectious disease deaths in Victoria (Australia)